Belsen is a village within the German borough of Bergen in the northern part of Celle district on the Lüneburg Heath in Lower Saxony. The Belsen concentration camp was named after it. Today Belsen is dominated by the former British Army camp of Hohne (German: Lager Hohne) on the edge of the NATO firing ranges.

History 
Belsen was first mentioned in the records in 1235 under the name Bellenhusen. Formerly an independent municipality, it is part of the town Bergen since 1971.

Bergen-Belsen concentration camp 
The Bergen-Belsen concentration camp was near Belsen. The site of the former concentration camp and the present-day Bergen-Belsen Memorial Centre are mainly within the municipality of Winsen (Aller) and its parish of Walle (Winsen). The original ramps have been replaced and the current ramps are used today to off-load military vehicles of the British, Dutch, French, German, Belgian, Luxembourg and Polish forces in order to take part in exercises on the NATO military training area of Bergen-Hohne.

Bergen-Belsen displaced persons camp

After the Second World War, a displaced persons (DP) camp was created in the military base of Lager Hohne (called Bergen-Hohne Station or Hohne Camp during its British tenure), opposite the village. Called the Bergen-Belsen displaced persons camp. It was in operation from the summer of 1945 until September 1950. For a time, Belsen DP camp was the largest Jewish DP camp in Germany and the only one in the British occupation zone with an exclusively Jewish population.

Politics and administration 
Since the merging of local councils as part of the Lower Saxon administrative reforms of 1971, Belsen has been part of the borough of Bergen. Belsen is represented by a local council (Ortsrat) and a chairman (Ortsbürgermeister). The council is empowered, inter alia, to make decisions about public services in the village, is responsible for maintaining the appearance of the village and for overseeing its clubs and societies, and has to be consulted by the town of Bergen on all important matters affecting the village. It consists of five elected representatives who, together with the chairman, sit on the Bergen town council. The village council elects its own chairman. The current incumbent is Sven Marquardt.

See also
 :de:Arbeitsgemeinschaft Bergen-Belsen, The Bergen-Belsen Society

Footnotes and references

Literature 
 Friedrich Barenscheer u.a., Bauernbuch, o.J. (about 1935). In the Bergen Town Archives (Stadtarchiv Bergen)
 Quellensammlung zur Ortsgeschichte Belsen, In the Bergen Town Archives
 Lehnsbriefe über Belehnung der Mühle Belsen, (from 1554), In the Bergen Town Archives

Villages in Lower Saxony
Bergen, Lower Saxony
Celle (district)
Holocaust locations in Germany